Irpex destruens is a species of fungus in the family Meruliaceae. A plant pathogen, it causes stump rot. It was first described scientifically by English mycologist Thomas Petch in 1909.

References

Fungi described in 1909
Fungi of Asia
Fungal plant pathogens and diseases
Meruliaceae
Taxa named by Thomas Petch